Ogooué et des Lacs is a department of Moyen-Ogooué Province in western Gabon. Its capital is also the province's capital, Lambaréné. It had a population of 54,346 in 2013.

Towns and villages
 Bindo

References

Moyen-Ogooué Province
Departments of Gabon